Michał Mokrzycki (born 29 December 1997) is a Polish professional footballer who plays as a defensive midfielder for I liga club ŁKS Łódź, on loan from Wisła Płock.

References

External links
 
 

Polish footballers
1997 births
Living people
Stal Rzeszów players
Stal Mielec players
Korona Kielce players
Stal Stalowa Wola players
Ruch Chorzów players
Wisła Płock players
ŁKS Łódź players
People from Rzeszów
Association football midfielders
Ekstraklasa players
II liga players
III liga players